Galaz is a surname. Notable people with the surname include:

Patricio Galaz (born 1976), Chilean footballer
Su Helen Galaz (born 1991), Chilean footballer

Spanish-language surnames
Portuguese-language surnames